John William McCall (July 18, 1925 – February 5, 2015) was a relief pitcher in Major League Baseball who played from 1948 through 1957 for the Boston Red Sox (1948–49), Pittsburgh Pirates (1950) and New York Giants (1954–57). He was born in San Francisco, California, and studied at the University of San Francisco. He was a United States Marine Corps veteran of World War II, serving in the Pacific Theater of Operations, including Iwo Jima and Okinawa.

In a seven-season MLB career, McCall posted an 11–15 record with a 4.22 ERA and 12 saves in 134 appearances, including 15 starts, four complete games, 144 strikeouts, 103 walks, 249 hits allowed, and 253 innings of work. McCall also pitched for the San Francisco Seals of the Pacific Coast League from 1951 to 1953. According to the Baseball Register, McCall was nicknamed "Windy" by Red Sox slugger Ted Williams as a young player "because he was always asking about Ted's bats." McCall died on February 5, 2015, but the news of his death did not reach researchers until 2016.

References

External links

 Windy McCall - Baseballbiography.com
 Retrosheet

1925 births
2015 deaths
United States Marine Corps personnel of World War II
Baseball players from San Francisco
Birmingham Barons players
Boston Red Sox players
Indianapolis Indians players
Louisville Colonels (minor league) players
Major League Baseball pitchers
Miami Marlins (IL) players
New York Giants (NL) players
Pittsburgh Pirates players
Roanoke Red Sox players
San Francisco Dons baseball players
San Francisco Seals (baseball) players
Seattle Rainiers players